55576 Amycus  is a centaur discovered on 8 April 2002 by the NEAT at Palomar.

The minor planet was named for Amycus, a male centaur in Greek mythology.

It came to perihelion in February 2003.

A low probability asteroid occultation of star UCAC2 17967364 with an apparent magnitude of +13.8 was possible on 11 February 2009. Another such event involving a star with an apparent magnitude of +12.9 occurred on 10 April 2014 at about 10:46 Universal Time, visible for observers in the southwest US and western Mexico.

Near 3:4 resonance of Uranus 
Amycus (2002 GB10) lies within 0.009 AU of the 3:4 resonance of Uranus and is estimated to have a long orbital half-life of about 11.1 Myr.

See also 
 
 List of Solar System objects by size

References

External links 
 

Centaurs (small Solar System bodies)
055576
Named minor planets
20020408